José or Josep Prat may refer to:

 José Prat (anarchist) (1860s–1932), Catalan anarchist, writer, and syndicalist theoretician
 José Prat (politician) (1905–1994), Spanish politician and lawyer
  (1898–1987), Spanish politician, lawyer, and journalist
  (1911–1988), Spanish association football player and coach
 Josep Prat i Bonet (1894–1936), Catalan leader of Argentinean Esperantist movement